Murray H. Goodman (born 1925) is an American real estate developer, philanthropist, and founder of Goodman Properties (also known as The Goodman Company). He is Lehigh University's most generous living benefactor, and the Goodman Campus and 16,000-seat Goodman Stadium are named in his honor.

Early life
Murray Goodman was born in Bethlehem, Pennsylvania. He was educated at Liberty High School there.

Goodman served in the USAAF for 2.5 years. He then received a bachelor's degree in business administration from Lehigh University graduating in 1948, and was captain of the basketball team in 1947.

Career
The Goodman Company, headquartered in West Palm Beach, Florida, was founded in 1960 in Allentown, Pennsylvania. It has actively and successfully developed regional malls and power centers throughout Pennsylvania, Florida, New Jersey, Virginia, and Ohio for over five decades. Goodman began his career as a general contractor, constructing institutional buildings and developing supermarkets, service stations, and small shopping centers in eastern Pennsylvania. The company was an early pioneer in the development and management of regional and super-regional malls with more than 24 million square feet of commercial space.

In 1980, he developed The Esplanade on Worth Avenue in Palm Beach, Florida. Since 2004, it changed its name to 150 Worth. In 2014, it Goodman sold it for $146 million.

Goodman has developed, owned and managed over 18 million square feet of shopping malls from Neptune, New Jersey, to Bethlehem, Pennsylvania. The company is no longer building any ground up projects, but is seeking to buy existing retail properties in Florida, Texas, Nevada, Washington, Wyoming, South Dakota, Tennessee, and New Hampshire.

Goodman is a long-time member and trustee of the International Council of Shopping Centers. He has previously been ranked as one of the leading developers and managers of shopping malls by Shopping Center World, a trade publication.

Philanthropy
The Goodman Campus, one of three at Lehigh University, is named in his honor, Goodman having donated 550 acres in Lower Saucon Township, Pennsylvania, in 1983 to build a sports complex, including the 16,000-seat Murray H. Goodman Stadium. He is Lehigh's  most generous living benefactor.

Personal life
Goodman is married to Joanie Mellor Goodman, they have five children, and live in Palm Beach, Florida. They originally lived in Pennsylvania. In 2009, Goodman listed his apartment at 960 Fifth Avenue in Manhattan at $32.5 million, but sold it to Benjamin Steinbruch two years later for $18.875 million. In 2015, he sold Turtle Lane Farm, his family's "lavish equestrian property" in Wellington, Florida for $9.675 million.

In 2013, their daughter Marley Goodman, a real estate agent and former member of the U.S. Equestrian Team, married Brett Overman, president and CEO of National Disaster Solutions and Zip's Car Wash, also of Palm Beach, at the Mar-a-Lago Club, with Rabbi Solomon Rothstein officiating. They have a son, Malcolm Goodman.

References

External links
Murray H. Goodman at The Goodman Group

Living people
1925 births
American philanthropists
American real estate businesspeople
Lehigh University alumni
Liberty High School (Bethlehem, Pennsylvania) alumni
People from Bethlehem, Pennsylvania
People from West Palm Beach, Florida